Chiriqui Sign Language (Spanish: Lengua de Señas de Chiriquí, LSCH) is the principal deaf sign language of the province of Chiriquí in Panama. It's not clear if it's related to Panamanian Sign Language, which is not mutually intelligible with it; if so, it would also be related to American Sign Language.

References

Sign languages
Sign languages of Panama